The First Baptist Church  is a historic U.S. Southern Baptist church in Madison, Florida. It is located at the corner of Pickney and Orange Streets. On November 14, 1978, it was added to the U.S. National Register of Historic Places.

References

Gallery

Churches in Madison County, Florida
Churches on the National Register of Historic Places in Florida
National Register of Historic Places in Madison County, Florida
Southern Baptist Convention churches
1898 establishments in Florida